Inside Jennifer Welles is a 1977 pornographic film starring Jennifer Welles, an American porn star chiefly active in the soft and hardcore genres of the 1970s, although she began her acting career in the late 1960s in the sexploitation genre. The allegedly autobiographical film is one of the classics of the Golden Age of Porn.

The credits for Inside Jennifer Welles (1977) credit Welles with being the director, although the film was actually anonymously directed by sexploitation veteran Joseph W. Sarno.

Cast
 Jennifer Welles as herself
 Ken Anderson as Dr. Ward
 Peter Andrews as Bert's Roommate
 Cheri Baines as Miss Haskell
 Robert Kerman as Projectionist

References

External links
 
 
 

1977 films
1970s pornographic films
Films directed by Joseph W. Sarno
American pornographic films
1970s English-language films
1970s American films